Margaret Lord (born August 11, 1948) was a Canadian politician. She served in the Legislative Assembly of British Columbia from 1991 to 1996, as a NDP member for the constituency of Comox Valley.

References

1948 births
British Columbia New Democratic Party MLAs
Living people
Politicians from Victoria, British Columbia
Women MLAs in British Columbia